The Indian subcontinent has a history of earthquakes. The reason for the intensity and high frequency of earthquakes is the Indian plate driving into Asia at a rate of approximately 47 mm/year. The following is a list of major earthquakes which have occurred in India, including those with epicentres outside India that caused significant damage or casualties in the country.

Earthquakes

* Bold refers to Pre-Independence

See also
 Earthquake zones of India
 Geology of India

References 

Sources

Further reading

External links
 Earthquake Reports, India Meteorological Department (on line)

 
Earthquake
India
Earthquakes
Tsunamis in India